Duncan "Melvin" Tarley (born October 31, 1982) is a Liberian footballer.

Career

Professional
Tarley first came to prominence in 2005, during Minnesota Thunder's run to the semi finals of the 2005 Lamar Hunt U.S. Open Cup. Tarley scored six goals in the competition - including four against Real Salt Lake - to tie as the tournament's top goalscorer.

Tarley's first appearance in Major League Soccer came with Real Salt Lake in 2005. The Colorado Rapids acquired Tarley's rights from Real Salt Lake in exchange for a 4th round pick in the 2007 MLS Supplemental Draft on August 15, 2006, but he was waived by the Rapids at the end of the 2006 season having appeared in just three games. He returned to the Minnesota Thunder of the USL-1 for one season, prior to joining the Puerto Rico Islanders in 2007, and later moving on to Miami FC, also in 2007.

Tarley re-joined Minnesota Thunder in 2008. On March 22, 2010 he signed with NSC Minnesota Stars.

International
At the time of Tarley's selection for the Liberian U-21 national team in 1998, he was the youngest player in team history, only 14 years old.  He played his first game for the senior national team in 2004.

Personal
Tarley's football hero during his youth in Liberia was George Weah, while his current favorite player is Thierry Henry.

References

External links
Minnesota Thunder bio

Liberian Soccer profile

1982 births
Living people
Liberia international footballers
Sportspeople from Monrovia
Liberian footballers
Real Salt Lake players
Colorado Rapids players
A-League (1995–2004) players
USL First Division players
Minnesota Thunder players
Major League Soccer players
Puerto Rico Islanders players
Miami FC (2006) players
Expatriate footballers in Cambodia
Phnom Penh Crown FC players
Minnesota United FC (2010–2016) players
Liberian expatriates in Puerto Rico
USSF Division 2 Professional League players
Association football forwards